Great Warley is a village in the Warley ward of Brentwood borough in Essex, England. It is situated to the far south west of the county and near to the Greater London boundary and the M25 motorway.

Consecrated in 1904, the Grade I listed parish church, St Mary the Virgin is noted for its art nouveau interior. A little further to the south is The Kilns Hotel which dates back to the 16th Century.

History
In 1901 it had a population of 1,900. Great Warley Parish Council was the parish council from 1894 to 1934.

The remaining area was transferred to Hornchurch Urban District which in 1965 was transferred to Greater London to form part of the London Borough of Havering.

In 1993, following the first periodic review of Greater London, the boundary between Brentwood and Havering was locally realigned to the M25 motorway in the west and the London, Tilbury and Southend line in the south by the Essex and Greater London (County and London Borough Boundaries) (No.2) Order 1993. This transferred almost all of the remaining part of Great Warley in Greater London back to Essex.

References

Villages in Essex
Former civil parishes in Essex
Brentwood (Essex town)